Stephen Michael Essuah Kofi Ackah is a Ghanaian politician and member of the Seventh Parliament of the Fourth Republic of Ghana representing the Suaman Constituency in the Western Region on the ticket of the National Democratic Congress.

Early life and education 
Ackah hails from Suaman-Dadieso in the Western region. He had his post secondary teacher training at Wesley College, Kumasi and proceeded to the Specialist Training College (STC), Winneba where he obtained his diploma. He earned his Bachelor of Education (BEd) in Physical Education from the University of Education, Winneba in 2000, and had his Executive Masters in Governance and Leadership (EMGL) Ghana Institute of Management and Public Administration (GIMPA) in 2000.

Career 
He worked at the Ghana Education Service GES) as an assistant director and as a tutor at Ejisuman Senior High School.

Politics
Ackah entered parliament on 7 January 2005 representing the Suaman constituency on the ticket of the National Democratic Party. He has remained in parliament for four consecutive parliamentary terms.

In parliament, he has served on various committees, including the Subsidiary Legislation Committee, the Local Government and Rural Development Committee, the Youth, Sports and Culture Committee, and the Special Budget Committee.

Personal life 
Ackah is married with three children. He is a Christian who fellowships at Methodist.

References

Ghanaian MPs 2017–2021
1950 births
Living people
National Democratic Congress (Ghana) politicians
University of Education, Winneba alumni
Ghanaian MPs 2001–2005
Ghanaian MPs 2005–2009
Ghanaian MPs 2009–2013
Ghanaian MPs 2013–2017
Ghanaian Methodists
Ghanaian schoolteachers